Telema is a genus of long-legged cave spiders that was first described by Eugène Louis Simon in 1882.

Species
 it contains six species, most found in Asia, except for T. tenella, found in Europe, and T. mayana, found in Guatemala:
Telema auricoma Lin & Li, 2010 – China
Telema guihua Lin & Li, 2010 – China
Telema mayana Gertsch, 1973 – Guatemala
Telema nipponica (Yaginuma, 1972) – Japan
Telema tenella Simon, 1882 (type) – Spain, France
Telema wunderlichi Song & Zhu, 1994 – China

See also
List of Telemidae species
Pinelema
Usofila

References

Araneomorphae genera
Spiders of Asia
Spiders of Central America
Telemidae